Amshold Group Limited is Alan Sugar's private holding company. The company is responsible for all of Alan Sugar's private companies and companies formed in partnership with Alan Sugar as a result of the UK TV show The Apprentice.

In March 2013 the company's headquarters won a Building Design Award. James Hughes, Estates Director for Amshold Group Limited received the award on behalf of the company.

Daughter companies
Amsprop
Amsair
Amscreen
Amshold Securities
Amstar Media

AvenTOM

Hyper Recruitment Solutions
Dr Leah Clinics & Skin Care
Climb Online
ImpraGas (formerly)
Ridiculously Rich
Right Time Recruitment
Sweets in the City
SianMarie
Tropic Skincare

Employment Tribunal
In May 2013 Amshold was cleared of a constructive dismissal claim brought by Stella English, winner of the sixth series of The Apprentice. In the ruling it was stated the case was: "a claim which should never have been brought."

In June 2013 it was reported that Alan Sugar was suing Stella English for £35,000 "to recover costs". Later that year the East London Tribunal Service ruled that English would not be required to pay any of the costs, which by then had grown to £50,000.

References

External links
Official Amshold Website
Official Amshold YouTube Channel

Holding companies established in 1999
Companies based in Essex
Holding companies of the United Kingdom
British companies established in 1999
Privately held companies